Wallsend is a western suburb of Newcastle, New South Wales, Australia  from Newcastle's central business district. It is split between the City of Newcastle and City of Lake Macquarie local government areas.

Origins 
The Awabakal and Worimi peoples are acknowledged by City of Newcastle as the descendants of the traditional custodians of the land situated within the Newcastle local government area, including wetlands, rivers creeks and coastal environments. It is known that their heritage and cultural ties to Newcastle date back tens of thousands of years.

Lieutenant Edward Close, an engineer and founder of Morpeth, recorded that part of the Wallsend area was called Barrahinebin by the Aboriginal custodians. Close reported that Barrahinebin was used to describe the area bounded by the Hunter River, Ironbark Creek and Mount Sugarloaf.

Wallsend was named after a North of England coal mining township, initially built at the end of a Roman defensive wall, a suburb of Newcastle upon Tyne. The name was given to the area by Alexander Brown in the 1850s when he purchased land bounded by what are now Newcastle Road, Boundary and Croudace Streets and beyond Gunambi Road. The company he formed to operate the colliery which opened in January 1861 was called the Newcastle-Wallsend Coal Company.

The suburb began as two mining towns, Wallsend and Plattsburg. Wallsend was the more developed and as it grew it linked to Plattsburg via Nelson Street. Wallsend was proclaimed a separate municipality in early 1874 but the two areas had re-joined by 1915. The coal mined at Wallsend was of very good quality and the township prospered creating the commercial hub it is today.

Education 
Plattsburg Public School is a government co-educational school located on Ranclaud Street. There also another co-educational government primary school called Wallsend Public School located on 26 Martindale Street. There is also a catholic co-educational primary school called St Patrick's Primary School located on Macquarie Street. Wallsend junior campus which a part of Callaghan Campus is a 7-10 co-educational government high school located on Macquarie street.

Modern Day Wallsend 
Today Wallsend has outgrown the historic main street and received investment and expansion from local business and national companies. The main street of Wallsend has also experienced a changing face of business with new restaurants and real estate agencies, as well as home building companies occupying previous local businesses that have migrated to the larger Wallsend Village shopping centre (formerly owned by ).

Heritage listings
Wallsend has a number of heritage-listed sites, including:
 76 Cowper Street: Wallsend Railway Goods Shed

References

External links 
 Wallsend Town Committee: www.wallsendtown.com.au – "Wallsend Town will be a safe, vibrant, family friendly business district that values its history whilst embracing its exciting future "

Suburbs of Newcastle, New South Wales